In mathematics, an Oper is a principal connection, or in more elementary terms a type of differential operator. They were first defined and used by Vladimir Drinfeld and Vladimir Sokolov to study how the KdV equation and related integrable PDEs correspond to algebraic structures known as Kac–Moody algebras. Their modern formulation is due to Drinfeld and Alexander Beilinson.

History 
Opers were first defined, although not named, in a 1981 Russian paper by Drinfeld and Sokolov on Equations of Korteweg–de Vries type, and simple Lie algebras. They were later generalized by Drinfeld and Beilinson in 1993, later published as an e-print in 2005.

Formulation

Abstract 
Let  be a connected reductive group over the complex plane , with a distinguished Borel subgroup . Set , so that  is the Cartan group.

There is an open -orbit  consisting of vectors stabilized by the radical  such that all of their negative simple-root components are non-zero.

Let  be a smooth curve.

Example 
Fix  the Riemann sphere. Working at the level of the algebras, fix , which can be identified with the space of traceless  complex matrices. Since  has only one (complex) dimension, a one-form has only one component, and so an -valued one form is locally described by a matrix of functions

where  are allowed to be meromorphic functions.

The action is by a formal gauge transformation:

Then opers are defined in terms of a subspace of these connections. Denote by 

with  meromorphic.

Then for  it holds that . It therefore defines an action. The orbits of this action concretely characterize opers. However, generally this description only holds locally and not necessarily globally.

Gaudin model 

Opers on  have been used by Boris Feigin, Edward Frenkel and Nicolai Reshetikhin to characterize the spectrum of the Gaudin model.

Specifically, for a -Gaudin model, and defining  as the Langlands dual algebra, there is a bijection between the spectrum of the Gaudin algebra generated by operators defined in the Gaudin model and an algebraic variety of  opers.

References 

Differential operators
Connection (mathematics)